Das Liebesmahl der Apostel (1843) WWV 69 (in English The Feast of Pentecost, "The Love-Meal of the Apostles") is a piece for orchestra and male choruses by Richard Wagner. It is rarely performed and little known. Many years after having written it, Wagner described it as "a sort of folkloric miracle play".

History
Wagner, who had been elected in January 1843 to the committee of a cultural association in the city of Dresden, received a commission to evoke the theme of Pentecost. He had successfully performed Rienzi in Dresden in 1842; however, Der fliegende Holländer, produced there in January 1843, was not received as warmly.

The premiere of Das Liebesmahl took place at the Dresdner Frauenkirche on 6 July 1843, and was performed by around a hundred musicians and almost 1,200 singers, from all over Saxony. The work was dedicated to Charlotte Emilie Weinlig, the widow of Wagner's former teacher Christian Theodor Weinlig. The concert was very well received, but Wagner was disappointed by its "relatively feeble effect" in view of the vast assembly of singers it had brought together.

Instrumentation
Choir
Tenor baritone bass
12 bass (The Twelve Apostles)
16 tenor 12 baritone 12 bass (Voices from above)
Orchestra
Woodwinds: piccolo, 2 flutes, 2 oboes, 2 clarinets, 4 bassoons, serpent
Brass: 4 horns, 4 trumpets, 3 trombones, tuba
Percussion: 4 timpani
Strings: 16 first violins, 16 second violins, 12 violas, 12 cellos, 8 basses

Description
The choir in three or four parts at first respond at length a cappella, evoking the disarray of the apostles, then comes together in a crescendo calling upon the Spirit to descend. Then comes the chorus "Be comforted", preceding an intervention by the orchestra, soon to accompany the descent of the Holy Spirit, in a triumphant ensemble.

External links
 Digital Score on the website of the Saxon State and University Library, Dresden

Media

Compositions by Richard Wagner
1843 compositions
Choral compositions